John Victor Leathersich (born July 14, 1990) is an American former Major League Baseball (MLB) pitcher who played for the New York Mets, Chicago Cubs, and Pittsburgh Pirates between 2015 and 2017.

Amateur career
After graduating from Beverly High School, Leathersich attended the University of Massachusetts Lowell. In 2010 and 2011, he played collegiate summer baseball with the Orleans Firebirds of the Cape Cod Baseball League. As a senior, he went 6-2 with a 1.62 earned run average 126 strikeouts (12.74 strikeouts per nine). The strikeouts and strikeouts per nine were both school records.

Professional career

New York Mets
Leathersich was drafted by the New York Mets in the fifth round of the 2011 Major League Baseball Draft. Leathersich made his professional debut with the short season Brooklyn Cyclones of the New York–Penn League. He finished the season with a 0.71 ERA and 26 strikeouts in  innings pitched. Leathersich started the 2012 season with the Savannah Sand Gnats of the South Atlantic League. He was promoted to the High-A St. Lucie Mets after posting a 0.75 earned run average and 37 strikeouts in 24 innings. In 48 innings with St. Lucie, he had a 4.26 ERA and 76 strikeouts. Leathersich was invited to spring training by the Mets in 2013. He started the season with the Double-A Binghamton Mets.

Leathersich was promoted to the major leagues for the first time on April 28, 2015. On May 1, 2015, Leathersich was sent down back to the Las Vegas 51s to make room for Dilson Herrera. He was called back up on May 14, 2015. On July 30, 2015 it was announced Jack Leathersich would undergo season ending Tommy John surgery. 

Leathersich finished the 2015 season with a 0-1 record, 2.31 ERA in 17 games with 14 strikeouts in 11.2 innings pitched with a WHIP of 1.63 while giving up 12 hits, 3 runs, and 7 walks.

Chicago Cubs
Leathersich was claimed off waivers by the Chicago Cubs on November 19, 2015. He was then non-tendered by the Cubs on December 2, 2015, thus making him a free agent. On December 23, 2015, the Cubs re-signed him where he rehabbed the 2016 season after undergoing Tommy John in July. The Cubs added him to their 40-man roster after the 2016 season.

Pittsburgh Pirates
On September 4, 2017, Leathersich was claimed off waivers by the Pittsburgh Pirates. He was placed on waivers on March 26, 2018.

Cleveland Indians
Leathersich was claimed off waivers by the Cleveland Indians on March 27, 2018.

Leathersich was designated for assignment on April 26, 2018. After clearing waivers, he was outrighted to the Indians' Triple-A affiliate, the Columbus Clippers. He was released on July 12, 2018.

Texas Rangers
On December 21, 2018, Leathersich signed a minor league contract with the Texas Rangers. He was released on March 14, 2019.

References

External links

1990 births
Living people
Sportspeople from Beverly, Massachusetts
Baseball players from Massachusetts
UMass Lowell River Hawks baseball players
Major League Baseball pitchers
New York Mets players
Chicago Cubs players
Pittsburgh Pirates players
Brooklyn Cyclones players
Savannah Sand Gnats players
St. Lucie Mets players
Binghamton Mets players
Las Vegas 51s players
Arizona League Cubs players
Tennessee Smokies players
Iowa Cubs players
Orleans Firebirds players
Beverly High School alumni